Gonzalo Rubén Bergessio (born 20 July 1984) is an Argentine professional footballer who plays as a striker for Club Atlético Platense.

Club career

Early career
Born in Córdoba, Córdoba Province, Bergessio started his career in the lower leagues with Club Atlético Platense. In 2005, he was signed by Instituto Atlético Central Córdoba of the Primera División, but at the end of the 2005–06 season Instituto were relegated, and the player was sold to Racing Club de Avellaneda.

Bergessio contributed six goals in the Apertura 2006 and, in the following year's Clausura, continued to score on a regular basis. His fast pace earned him a big following at the Estadio Juan Domingo Perón, and he became a fan favourite after scoring the game winner against Boca Juniors, adding another against Club Atlético River Plate.

Benfica, return to Argentina
On 26 June 2007, Bergessio signed a five-year deal with Primeira Liga club S.L. Benfica for a reported €2.5 million fee, as an unknown party remained eligible to 50% of the future transfer fee the Portuguese received. He only appeared in three league matches during his spell, one more than his opportunities in the UEFA Champions League, and, in January of the following year he returned to his country.

In January 2008, Bergessio joined San Lorenzo de Almagro. On 8 May, he was involved in the Copa Libertadores tie against River where, after his team had two players sent off and were 0–2 down, he scored twice to give it an improbable aggregate win.

Saint-Étienne
On 25 August 2009, Bergessio returned to Europe by agreeing to a four-year contract with France's AS Saint-Étienne, for an undisclosed fee. He scored his first goal for his new club during his second appearance, a 1–1 home draw with AJ Auxerre, but netted just five times more in his first one and a half seasons with the Ligue 1 club.

Catania
In the last hours of the 2011 winter transfer window, Bergessio joined Italian side Calcio Catania, arriving on loan for the remainder of the season – the Sicilians had the option to sign him player permanently at the conclusion of this loan agreement. He made his Serie A debut on 20 February, playing the full 90 minutes and being booked in a 1–0 away loss against S.S.C. Napoli.

After an initial delay in the transfer, Bergessio signed a permanent four-year contract on 29 August 2011 for €945,000. In the 2012–13 campaign he became a key part of Rolando Maran's team, forming an efficient attacking partnership with countrymen Pablo Barrientos, Lucas Castro and Papu Gómez; he scored his first hat-trick in Italy's top flight on 5 May 2013, in the 3–0 home win over A.C. Siena.

Bergessio helped Catania eventually finish in eighth position, with a record in total points for the fifth consecutive season. On a personal level he was also the club's highest goalscorer during a single campaign, since Gionatha Spinesi netted 17 times in 2006–07.

On 30 October 2013, Bergessio suffered a broken fibula as a result of a late tackle by Giorgio Chiellini in a 4–0 defeat at Juventus FC.

Sampdoria
On 1 August 2014, Bergessio was sold to U.C. Sampdoria of the same country and league for a fee of €2.65 million, putting pen to paper to a three-year deal. On 3 June of the following year, after 24 appearances in all competitions and two goals, he was released by mutual consent.

Later years
Bergessio moved teams and countries again on 24 June 2015, joining Atlas F.C. from Mexico. The following 8 September, he signed a one-year deal with former club San Lorenzo.

International career
Bergessio made his debut for Argentina on 15 October 2008, playing the second half of a 1–0 loss in Chile for the 2010 FIFA World Cup qualifiers. He scored his first and only two goals for his country on 20 May of the following year, in a 3–1 win over Panama.

References

External links

1984 births
Living people
Argentine footballers
Footballers from Córdoba, Argentina
Association football forwards
Argentine Primera División players
Club Atlético Platense footballers
Instituto footballers
Racing Club de Avellaneda footballers
San Lorenzo de Almagro footballers
Club Atlético Vélez Sarsfield footballers
Primeira Liga players
S.L. Benfica footballers
Ligue 1 players
AS Saint-Étienne players
Serie A players
Catania S.S.D. players
U.C. Sampdoria players
Liga MX players
Atlas F.C. footballers
Uruguayan Primera División players
Club Nacional de Football players
Argentina international footballers
Argentine expatriate footballers
Expatriate footballers in Portugal
Expatriate footballers in France
Expatriate footballers in Italy
Expatriate footballers in Mexico
Expatriate footballers in Uruguay
Argentine expatriate sportspeople in Portugal
Argentine expatriate sportspeople in France
Argentine expatriate sportspeople in Italy
Argentine expatriate sportspeople in Mexico
Argentine expatriate sportspeople in Uruguay